Alex Kerr may refer to:

 Alex Kerr (footballer) (1880–?), Australian rules footballer
 Alex Kerr (Japanologist) (born 1952), American writer and Japanologist
 Alex Kerr (loyalist), Northern Irish former loyalist paramilitary